"Find the Way" is the ninth single by Mika Nakashima. Written by Nakashima and Lori Fine, the single was released by Sony Records on August 6, 2003. It was used as the third ending theme of the anime series Mobile Suit Gundam SEED.

The single peaked at No. 4 on Oricon's singles chart and sold roughly 124,489 copies.

Track listing

Chart positions 
Weekly charts

Year-end charts

References

External links
 Official website
 
 

2003 singles
Mika Nakashima songs
Songs written by Mika Nakashima
Gundam songs
Japanese-language songs
Sony Music Entertainment Japan singles